Hrad Vallis is an ancient outflow channel in the Cebrenia quadrangle of Mars, located at 38.7° north latitude and 224.7° west longitude. It is 825 km in length and was named for the word for "Mars" in Armenian.

Volcano ice interactions 
Large amounts of water ice are believed to be present under the surface of Mars. Some channels lie near volcanic areas. When hot subsurface molten rock comes close to this ice, large amounts of liquid water and mud may be formed. Hrad Vallis in the Cebrenia quadrangle is close to Elysium Mons, a large volcano, and may have supplied water to create the channel.

References

See also

 Geography of Mars
 Geology of Mars
 HiRISE
 Lakes on Mars
 Outflow channels
 Vallis (planetary geology)
 Water on Mars

Cebrenia quadrangle
Valleys and canyons on Mars